KIVY, K275AS, & K288HF (1290 AM, 102.9 & 105.5 FM) is an AM radio station combined with dual FM translators broadcasting an adult standards format to the rural communities of southern Anderson and most of Houston County, Texas, including Crockett, Latexo, Grapeland, and Elkhart. Licensed to Crockett, Texas, United States, the station serves the Jacksonville-Palestine area. The station is currently owned by Leon Hunt.

Current ESPN announcer Carter Blackburn began his broadcast career at KIVY, calling high school football games.

Translators

References

External links

IVY
Adult standards radio stations in the United States
Radio stations established in 1993
1993 establishments in Texas